This is an incomplete list of the paintings by the  British Impressionist artist Alfred Sisley, who was born to British parents in France, where he subsequently spent the majority of his life.

Timeline
 1839 Born in Paris
 1839–1870 Paris 
 1870–1875 Louveciennes, Yvelines (visit to England, 1874)
 1875–1877 Marly-le-Roi, Yvelines
 1877–1880 Sèvres, Hauts-de-Seine
 1880–1882 Veneux-les-Sablons, Seine-et-Marne
 1882–1899 Moret-sur-Loing, Seine-et-Marne (visit to Wales, 1897)
 1899 Died in Moret-sur-Loing

1860s

1870s

1880s

1890s

References

Sisley, Alfred